Samuel M. Comer (July 13, 1893 – December 27, 1974) was a set decorator who worked on over 300 films during a career spanning four decades. He won four Academy Awards and was nominated for another 22 in the category Best Art Direction.

He guided his niece, Anjanette Comer into "the biz."

Academy Awards
Won
 The Rose Tattoo (1955)
 Sunset Boulevard (1950)
 Samson and Delilah (1949)
 Frenchman's Creek (1944)

Nominated
 Hud (1963)
 Love with the Proper Stranger (1963)
 Come Blow Your Horn (1963)
 The Pigeon That Took Rome (1962)
 Breakfast at Tiffany's (1961)
 Summer and Smoke (1961)
 Visit to a Small Planet (1960)
 It Started in Naples (1960)
 Career (1959)
 Vertigo (1958)
 Funny Face (1957)
 The Proud and Profane (1956)
 The Ten Commandments (1956)
 To Catch a Thief (1955)
 The Country Girl (1954)
 Sabrina (1954)
 Red Garters (1954)
 Kitty (1945)
 Love Letters (1945)
 No Time for Love (1943)
 Take a Letter, Darling (1942)
 Hold Back the Dawn (1941)

References

External links

1893 births
1974 deaths
American set decorators
Best Art Direction Academy Award winners
People from Topeka, Kansas